Mihajlo Veruović (born 15 September 2001), better known as Voyage (French for "journey"), is a Serbian rapper and actor.

Early life 
Mihajlo Veruović was born on 15 September 2001 in Belgrade, FR Yugoslavia. He is the son to mother Žana, who is a medical worker, and father Milan Veurović, who served as the bodyguard to Prime Minister of Serbia Zoran Đinđić. Following the 2003 assassination of Đinđić, Veruović fled to Strasbourg, France alongside his family, where he lived until the age of eight. His stage name "" comes from these events.

His initial interest in with music happed during primary school, when he started writing songs with his childhood friends. They subsequently formed a music collective called Company. Veruović graduated from the Ninth Belgrade Gymnasium.

Career
Voyage released his first song and music video, titled "Priđi bliže" (Come Closer), as a member of Company in 2015. They released several other songs before their eventual disbandment. His first studio album, titled Porok i greh (Vice and Sin), was released in April 2019 in collaboration with the recording artist Andre under Die Rich record label. Afterwards, Voyage began releasing songs under Generacija Zed. His first bigger success came with "Otrovan" (Poisoned), a collaboration with Henny in May 2019. Voyage announced his debut solo album So Fxcking Blessed for September. He rose to mainstream prominence by releasing singles with his then girlfriend Anđela Ignjatović, better known as Breskvica. The couple released nine singles in total, including "Budi tu" (Be Here, 2019), "Koraci u noći" (Footsteps in the Night, 2019) with Vuk Mob, and "Pancir" (Bulletproof Vest, 2020) featuring Tanja Savić.

In April 2021, Voyage pursued his solo career by releasing "Pleši" (Dance), featuring J Fado, for the official soundtrack to the Serbian crime film Južni vetar 2: Ubrzanje. It was followed by "Kartel" (Cartel) and "Bounce" featuring Snik in July. In the same month, he also collaborated with rappers Rasta and Nucci on singles "Aman" (For God's Sake) and "Balkan" (Balkans), respectively. In September, Voyage performed at the Music Week Festival in Ušće Park, Belgrade.

In late February 2022, it was announced that Voyage would be starring in the RTS crime series U klinču alongside Nikola Kojo and Branka Katić in the lead roles. On 26 January 2023, Voyage alongside Mimi Mercedez hosted the 2023 Music Awards Ceremony at the Belgrade Arena. During the ceremony, he also performed a medley of hits with Nucci.

Personal life 
Verouvić was in a relationship with fellow musician Breskvica. The couple broke up in January 2021 after two years of dating.

Discography

Albums 
 Porok i greh (2019); feat. Andre
 So Fxcking Blessed (2019)
 Europol (2023)

Singles

As lead artist

As featured artist

Filmography

Awards and nominations

References

External links
 
 

2001 births
Living people
Musicians from Belgrade
21st-century Serbian male singers
Serbian rappers
Serbian expatriates in France